The Okinawan language or Central Okinawan, is a Northern Ryukyuan language spoken primarily in the southern half of the island of Okinawa, as well as in the surrounding islands of Kerama, Kumejima, Tonaki, Aguni and a number of smaller peripheral islands. Central Okinawan distinguishes itself from the speech of Northern Okinawa, which is classified independently as the Kunigami language. Both languages are listed by UNESCO as endangered.

Though Okinawan encompasses a number of local dialects, the Shuri–Naha variant is generally recognized as the de facto standard, as it had been used as the official language of the Ryukyu Kingdom since the reign of King Shō Shin (1477–1526). Moreover, as the former capital of Shuri was built around the royal palace, the language used by the royal court became the regional and literary standard, which thus flourished in songs and poems written during that era.

Today, most Okinawans speak Okinawan Japanese, although a number of people still speak the Okinawan language, most often the elderly. Okinawan speakers are undergoing language shift as they switch to Japanese, since language use in Okinawa today is far from stable. Okinawans are assimilating and accenting standard Japanese due to the similarity of the two languages, the standardized and centralized education system, the media, business and social contact with mainlanders and previous attempts from Japan to suppress the native languages. Okinawan is still kept alive in popular music, tourist shows and in theaters featuring a local drama called , which depict local customs and manners.

History

Pre-Ryukyu Kingdom
Okinawan is a Japonic language, derived from Proto-Japonic and is therefore related to Japanese. The split between Old Japanese and the Ryukyuan languages has been estimated to have occurred as early as the 1st century AD to as late as the 12th century AD. Chinese and Japanese characters were first introduced by a Japanese missionary in 1265.

Ryukyu Kingdom era

Pre-Satsuma
Okinawan became the official language under King Shō Shin. The Omoro Sōshi, a compilation of ancient Ryukyuan poems, was written in an early form of Okinawan, known as Old Okinawan.

Post-Satsuma to annexation
After Ryukyu became a vassal of Satsuma Domain, kanji gained more prominence in poetry; however, official Ryukyuan documents were written in Classical Chinese. During this time, the language gradually evolved into Modern Okinawan.

In 1609, the Ryukyu Kingdom was colonized by the Satsuma Domain in the south of Japan. However, Satsuma did not fully invade the Ryukyu in fear of colliding with China, which had a stronger trading relationship with the Ryukyu at the time.

Japanese annexation to end of World War II
When Ryukyu was annexed by Japan in 1879, the majority of people on Okinawa Island spoke Okinawan. Within 10 years, the Japanese government began an assimilation policy of Japanization, where Ryukyuan languages were gradually suppressed. The education system was the heart of Japanization, where Okinawan children were taught Japanese and punished for speaking their native language, being told that their language was just a "dialect". By 1945, many Okinawans spoke Japanese, and many were bilingual. During the Battle of Okinawa, some Okinawans were killed by Japanese soldiers for speaking Okinawan.

Language shift to Japanese in Ryukyu/Okinawa began in 1879 when the Japanese government annexed Ryukyu and established Okinawa Prefecture. The prefectural office mainly consisted of people from Kagoshima Prefecture where the Satsuma Domain used to be. This caused the modernization of Okinawa as well as language shift to Japanese. As a result, Japanese became the standard language for administration, education, media, and literature.

In 1902, the  began the linguistic unification of Japan to Standard Japanese. This caused the linguistic stigmatization of many local varieties in Japan including Okinawan. As the discrimination accelerated, Okinawans themselves started to abandon their languages and shifted to Standard Japanese.

American occupation 
Under American administration, there was an attempt to revive and standardize Okinawan, but this proved difficult and was shelved in favor of Japanese. General Douglas MacArthur attempted to promote Okinawan languages and culture through education. Multiple English words were introduced.

Return to Japan to present day
After Okinawa's reversion to Japanese sovereignty, Japanese continued to be the dominant language used, and the majority of the youngest generations only speak Okinawan Japanese. There have been attempts to revive Okinawan by notable people such as Byron Fija and Seijin Noborikawa, but few native Okinawans know the language.

Outside of Japan
The Okinawan language is still spoken by communities of Okinawan immigrants in Brazil. The first immigrants from the island of Okinawa to Brazil landed in the Port of Santos in 1908 drawn by the hint of work and farmable land. Once in a new country and far from their homeland, they found themselves in a place where there was no prohibition of their language, allowing them to willingly speak, celebrate and preserve their speech and culture, up to the present day. Currently the Okinawan-Japanese centers and communities in the State of São Paulo are a world reference to this language helping it to stay alive.

Classification

Okinawan is sometimes grouped with Kunigami as the Okinawan languages; however, not all linguists accept this grouping, some claiming that Kunigami is a dialect of Okinawan. Okinawan is also grouped with Amami (or the Amami languages) as the Northern Ryukyuan languages.

Dialect of the Japanese language

Since the creation of Okinawa Prefecture, Okinawan has been labeled a dialect of Japanese as part of a policy of assimilation. Later, Japanese linguists, such as Tōjō Misao, who studied the Ryukyuan languages argued that they are indeed dialects. This is due to the misconception that Japan is a homogeneous state (one people, one language, one nation), and classifying the Ryukyuan languages as such would discredit this belief. The policy of assimilation, coupled with increased interaction between Japan and Okinawa through media and economics, has led to the development of Okinawan Japanese, which is a dialect of Japanese influenced by the Okinawan and Kunigami languages. Japanese and Okinawan only share 60% of the same vocabulary, despite both being Japonic languages.

Dialects of the Ryukyuan language

Okinawan linguist Seizen Nakasone states that the Ryukyuan languages are in fact groupings of similar dialects. As each community has its own distinct dialect, there is no "one language". Nakasone attributes this diversity to the isolation caused by immobility, citing the story of his mother who wanted to visit the town of Nago but never made the 25 km trip before she died of old age.

Its own distinct language
Outside Japan, Okinawan is considered a separate language from Japanese. This was first proposed by Basil Hall Chamberlain, who compared the relationship between Okinawan and Japanese to that of the Romance languages. UNESCO has marked it as an endangered language.

Sociolinguistics 
UNESCO listed six Okinawan language varieties as endangered languages in 2009. The endangerment of Okinawan is largely due to the shift to Standard Japanese. Throughout history, Okinawan languages have been treated as dialects of Standard Japanese. For instance, in the 20th century, many schools used "dialect tags" to punish the students who spoke in Okinawan. Consequently, many of the remaining speakers today are choosing not to transmit their languages to younger generations due to the stigmatization of the languages in the past.

There have been several revitalization efforts made to reverse this language shift. However, Okinawan is still poorly taught in formal institutions due to the lack of support from the Okinawan Education Council: education in Okinawa is conducted exclusively in Japanese, and children do not study Okinawan as their second language at school. As a result, at least two generations of Okinawans have grown up without any proficiency in their local languages both at home and school.

Phonology

Vowels 

Consonants 

The Okinawan language counts some 20 distinctive segments shown in the chart below, with major allophones presented in parentheses.

The only consonant that can occur as a syllable coda is the archiphoneme .

The consonant system of the Okinawan language is fairly similar to that of standard Japanese, but it does present a few differences on the phonemic and allophonic level. Additionally, Okinawan lacks the major allophones  and  found in Japanese, having historically fronted the vowel  to  after the alveolars , consequently merging  tsu into  chi,  su into  shi, and both  dzu and  zu into  ji. It also lacks  as a distinctive phoneme, having merged it into .

Bilabial and glottal fricatives
The bilabial fricative  has sometimes been transcribed as the cluster , since, like Japanese,  allophonically labializes into  before the high vowel , and  does not occur before the rounded vowel . However, this analysis fails to take account of the fact that Okinawan has not fully undergone the diachronic change  →  →  as in Japanese, and that the suggested clusterization and labialization into  is unmotivated.

Palatalization
The plosive consonants  and  historically palatalized and affricated into  before and occasionally following the glide  and the high vowel :  →  chiri "fog", and   →  chura- "beautiful". This change preceded vowel raising, so that instances where  arose from  did not trigger palatalization:  →  kī "hair".  Their voiced counterparts  and  underwent the same effect, becoming  under such conditions:  →  nnaji "eel", and  →  nukujiri "saw"; but  →  kagin "seasoning".

Both  and  may or may not also allophonically affricate before the mid vowel , though this pronunciation is increasingly rare. Similarly, the fricative consonant  palatalizes into  before the glide  and the vowel , including when  historically derives from :  →  shikē "world". It may also palatalize before the vowel , especially so in the context of topicalization:  dushi →  dusē or dushē "(topic) friend".

In general, sequences containing the palatal consonant  are relatively rare and tend to exhibit depalatalization.

Flapping and fortition
The voiced plosive  and the flap  tend to merge, with the first becoming a flap in word-medial position, and the second sometimes becoming a plosive in word-initial position. For example,  rū "dragon" may be strengthened into  dū, and  hashidu "door" conversely flaps into  hashiru. The two sounds do, however, still remain distinct in a number of words and verbal constructions.

Glottal stop
Okinawan also features a distinctive glottal stop  that historically arose from a process of glottalization of word-initial vowels.  Hence, all vowels in Okinawan are predictably glottalized at the beginning of words ( →  ami "rain"), save for a few exceptions. High vowel loss or assimilation following this process created a contrast with glottalized approximants and nasal consonants.  Compare  →  wa "pig" to  wa "I", or  →  nni "rice plant" to  →  nni "chest".

Moraic nasal
The moraic nasal  has been posited in most descriptions of Okinawan phonology. Like Japanese,  (transcribed using the small capital ) occupies a full mora and its precise place of articulation will vary depending on the following consonant. Before other labial consonants, it will be pronounced closer to a syllabic bilabial nasal , as in   nma "horse".  Before velar and labiovelar consonants, it will be pronounced as a syllabic velar nasal , as in   bingata, a method of dying clothes.  And before alveolar and alveolo-palatal consonants, it becomes a syllabic alveolar nasal , as in   kanda "vine". Elsewhere, its exact realization remains unspecified, and it may vary depending on the first sound of the next word or morpheme. In isolation and at the end of utterances, it is realized as a velar nasal .

Correspondences with Japanese 
There is a sort of "formula" for Ryukyuanizing Japanese words: turning e into i, ki into chi, gi into ji, o into u, and -awa into -ā. This formula fits with the transliteration of Okinawa into Uchinā and has been noted as evidence that Okinawan is a dialect of Japanese, however it does not explain unrelated words such as arigatō and nifēdēbiru (for "thank you").

Orthography 

The Okinawan language was historically written using an admixture of kanji and hiragana. The hiragana syllabary is believed to have first been introduced from mainland Japan to the Ryukyu Kingdom some time during the reign of king Shunten in the early thirteenth century. It is likely that Okinawans were already in contact with hanzi (Chinese characters) due to extensive trade between the Ryukyu Kingdom and China, Japan and Korea. However, hiragana gained more widespread acceptance throughout the Ryukyu Islands, and most documents and letters were exclusively transcribed using this script, in contrast to in Japan where writing solely in hiragana was considered "women's script". The Omoro Sōshi, a sixteenth-century compilation of songs and poetry, and a few preserved writs of appointments dating from the same century were written solely in Hiragana. Kanji were gradually adopted due to the growing influence of mainland Japan and to the linguistic affinity between the Okinawan and Japanese languages. However, it was mainly limited to affairs of high importance and to documents sent towards the mainland.  The oldest inscription of Okinawan exemplifying its use along with Hiragana can be found on a stone stele at the Tamaudun mausoleum, dating back to 1501.

After the invasion of Okinawa by the Shimazu clan of Satsuma in 1609, Okinawan ceased to be used in official affairs. It was replaced by standard Japanese writing and a form of Classical Chinese writing known as kanbun. Despite this change, Okinawan still continued to prosper in local literature up until the nineteenth century. Following the Meiji Restoration, the Japanese government abolished the domain system and formally annexed the Ryukyu Islands to Japan as the Okinawa Prefecture in 1879. To promote national unity, the government then introduced standard education and opened Japanese-language schools based on the Tokyo dialect. Students were discouraged and chastised for speaking or even writing in the local "dialect", notably through the use of "dialect cards". As a result, Okinawan gradually ceased to be written entirely until the American takeover in 1945.

Since then, Japanese and American scholars have variously transcribed the regional language using a number of ad hoc romanization schemes or the katakana syllabary to demarcate its foreign nature with standard Japanese. Proponents of Okinawan tend to be more traditionalist and continue to write the language using hiragana with kanji. In any case, no standard or consensus concerning spelling issues has ever been formalized, so discrepancies between modern literary works are common.

Syllabary
Technically, they are not syllables, but rather morae. Each mora in Okinawan will consist of one or two kana characters. If two, then a smaller version of kana follows the normal sized kana. In each cell of the table below, the top row is the kana (hiragana to the left, katakana to the right of the dot), the middle row in rōmaji (Hepburn romanization), and the bottom row in IPA.

Grammar 
Okinawan follows a subject–object–verb word order and makes large use of particles as in Japanese. Okinawan dialects retain a number of grammatical features of classical Japanese, such as a distinction between the terminal form and the attributive form, the genitive function of  ga (lost in the Shuri dialect), the nominative function of  nu (Japanese:  no), as well as honorific/plain distribution of ga and nu in nominative use.

One etymology given for the -un and -uru endings is the continuative form suffixed with uri (Classical Japanese:  wori, to be; to exist): -un developed from the terminal form uri; -uru developed from the attributive form uru, i.e.:
 kachuru derives from kachi-uru;
 kachun derives from kachi-uri; and
 yumun (Japanese:  yomu, to read) derives from yumi + uri.

A similar etymology is given for the terminal -san  and attributive -saru endings for adjectives: the stem suffixed with  sa (nominalises adjectives, i.e. high → height, hot → heat), suffixed with ari (Classical Japanese:  ari, to exist; to have), i.e.:

 takasan (Japanese:  takai, high; tall) derives from taka-sa-ari;
 achisan (Japanese:  atsui, hot; warm) derives from atsu-sa-ari; and
 yutasaru (good; pleasant) derives from yuta-sa-aru.

Parts of speech

Nouns (名詞)

Nouns are classified as independent, non-conjugating part of speech that can become a subject of a sentence

Pronouns (代名詞)
Pronouns are classified the same as nouns, except that pronouns are more broad.

Adverbs (副詞)

Adverbs are classified as an independent, non-conjugating part of speech that cannot become a subject of a sentence and modifies a declinable word (用言; verbs, adverbs, adjectives) that comes after the adverb. There are two main categories to adverbs and several subcategories within each category, as shown in the table below.

Prenominal adjectives (連体詞)

Conjunctions (接続詞)

Interjections and exclamations (感動詞)

Verbs (動詞)

Verbs are classified as an independent, conjugating part of speech that shows movements.

Adjectives (形容詞)

Adjectives are classified as an independent, conjugating part of speech that shows property or state.

(存在動詞)

存在動詞 are classified as an independent, conjugating part of speech that shows existence or decision of a certain thing.  attaches to a substantive.

Adjectival verbs (形容動詞)

Adjectival verbs are classified as an independent, conjugating part of speech that shows the state of existence of events.  attaches to words that shows state.

Auxiliary verbs (助動詞)

Particles (助詞)

Prefixes (接頭語)

Suffixes (接尾語)

Others

Copula

Question words (疑問詞)

Syntax
The basic word order is subject–object–verb.

Okinawan is a marked nominative language (with the accusative being unmarked) that also shows minor active–stative variation in intransitive verbs relating to existence or emergence. In existence or emergence verbs, the subject may be optionally unmarked (except for pronouns and proper names, which must be marked with ga), and marked human subjects cannot use ga anymore, but rather always with the often-inanimate marker nu.

Example

Sample text in Standard Okinawan (Shuri-Naha dialect)

In Kanji 
人間ー誰ん生まりやぎーなー自由やい、また、胴大切に思ゆる肝とぅ胴守らんでぃる肝ー、誰やてぃんゆぬ如授かとーるむんやん。人間ー元からいー矩ぬ備わとーくとぅ、互ーに兄弟やんでぃる考ーさーに事に当たらんだれーならん。(without ruby)

ーんまりやぎーなーやい、また、にゆるとぅらんでぃるー、やてぃんゆぬかとーるむんやん。ーからいーぬわとーくとぅ、ーにやんでぃるーさーににたらんだれーならん。(with ruby)

Transliteration 
Ninjinō tā n 'nmariyagīnā jiyu yai, mata, dū tēshichi ni umuyuru chimu tu dū mamurandiru chimō, tā yatin yunugutu sajakatōru mun yan. Ninjinō mūtu kara īka ni nu sunawatōkutu, tagē ni chōdēyandiru kangēsā ni kutu ni atarandarē naran.
(UDHR Article 1)

See also 
Okinawan Japanese, the language most commonly spoken in Okinawa today

Notes

References

External links 

 首里・那覇方言概説（首里・那覇方言音声データベース）
 うちなあぐち by Kiyoshi Fiza, an Okinawan language writer.
 JLect - Okinawa Language-Dialect Dictionary (definitions and meanings)

Ryukyuan languages